Dynamite is a 1949 American film noir drama film directed by William H. Pine and written by Milton Raison. The film stars William Gargan, Virginia Welles, Richard Crane, Irving Bacon, Mary Newton and Frank Ferguson. The film was released on January 18, 1949, by Paramount Pictures.

Plot

Cast  
William Gargan as 'Gunner' Peterson
Virginia Welles as Mary
Richard Crane as Johnny Brown
Irving Bacon as Jake
Mary Newton as Nellie Brown
Frank Ferguson as 'Hard Rock' Mason 
Douglass Dumbrille as Hank Gibbons

Production
The film was originally called Hard to Kill and was to star Richard Travis who signed a four picture deal with Pine Thomas.

References

External links 
 
Film review at Variety

1949 films
American black-and-white films
Paramount Pictures films
American drama films
1949 drama films
Films directed by William H. Pine
1940s English-language films
1940s American films